The N67 road is a national secondary road in Ireland. It runs from Galway to Tarbert and passes through Oranmore, Clarinbridge, Kinvara, Ballyvaughan, Lisdoonvarna, Ennistymon, Lahinch, Milltown Malbay, Quilty, Doonbeg, Kilkee, Moyasta, Kilrush and Killimer.

See also
Roads in Ireland 
Motorways in Ireland
National primary road
Regional road

References
Roads Act 1993 (Classification of National Roads) (Amendment) Order 2018 – Department of Transport

National secondary roads in the Republic of Ireland
Roads in County Kerry
Roads in County Limerick